The Alban Hills are the caldera remains of a quiescent volcanic complex in Italy, located  southeast of Rome and  about  north of Anzio. There are subsidiary calderas along the rim of the Alban Hills that contain the lakes Albano and Nemi. The hills are composed of peperino (lapis albanus), a variety of tuff that is useful for construction and provides a mineral-rich substrate for nearby vineyards.

History
The hills, especially around the shores of the lakes, have been popular since prehistoric times. From the 9th to 7th century BC, there were numerous villages (see the legendary Alba Longa and Tusculum). The area was inhabited by the Latini during the 5th to 3rd centuries BC.

The ancient Romans called the hill Albanus Mons. On the summit was the sanctuary of Jupiter Latiaris, in which the consuls celebrated the Feriae Latinae, and several generals celebrated victories here during times when they were not accorded regular triumphs in Rome.  The foundations and some of the architectural fragments of the temple were still in existence until 1777, when they were used to build the Passionist monastery by Cardinal York, but the Via Triumphalis leading up to it can still be seen.

In Roman times, the area was often used by the rich as a way to escape the heat and crowds of Rome, as it is today as shown by the many villas and country houses present.

Towns and cities

The towns and villages in the Alban Hills are known as the Castelli Romani.

Volcanic activity

Examination of deposits have dated the four most recent eruptions to two temporal peaks, around 36,000 and 39,000 years ago. The area exhibits small localised earthquake swarms, bradyseism, and release of carbon dioxide and hydrogen sulfide into the atmosphere. The uplift and earthquake swarms have been interpreted as caused by a slowly growing spherical magma chamber 5-6 kilometres below the surface; some think that it may erupt again; if so, there is risk to Rome, which is only 25 to 30 km away.

There is documentary evidence which may describe an eruption in 114 BC, but the absence of Holocene geological deposits has largely discredited it as a volcanic event and instead the account is considered to be a description of a forest fire.

The volcano emits large amounts of carbon dioxide which can potentially reach lethal concentrations if it accumulates in depressions in the ground in the absence of wind. The asphyxiation of 29 cows in September 1999 prompted a detailed survey, which found that concentration of the gas at 1.5 m above the ground in a residential area on the northwestern flank sometimes exceeded the occupational health threshold of 0.5%. Eight sheep were killed in a similar incident in October 2001.

People

Writers and artists who have produced work about this area include:
Thomas Ashby, archaeologist, wrote The Roman Campagna in Classic Time
William Brockedon painter and illustrator of guide-books
George Gordon Byron in Childe Harold's Pilgrimage
Charles Coleman painter
Johann Wolfgang von Goethe in Italian Journey
Louis Gurlitt, German painter
Jacob Philipp Hackert, German painter
Gavin Hamilton, artist and antiquarian, painter and archaeologist, in Genzano and Lanuvio (18th century)
James Duffield Harding in Tourist in Italy
John Henry Henshall watercolor painter
Richard Colt Hoare in A classical tour through Italy and Sicily
Ellis Cornelia Knight, writer and painter in Description of Latium or La Campagna di Roma
Edward Lear painter and lithographer
William Leighton Leitch watercolor painter in Lanuvio
Charles H. Poingdestre painter
John Singer Sargent, painter in Villa Torlonia - Frascati
Stendhal, writer, in Albano Laziale, Chroniques italiennes (1836–1839): L'Abbesse de Castro
J. M. W. Turner, RA, British painter
Georgina E. Troutbeck, Rambles in Rome - London - ed. Mills & Boon - 1914
Richard Voss, German dramatist and novelist
Clara Louisa Wells in The Alban Hills ed. 1878

Panorama

See also
List of volcanoes in Italy

References

External links

Ancient Roman temples
Geographical, historical and cultural regions of Italy
Castelli Romani
Mountains of Lazio
Volcanoes of Italy
Alba Longa
Latial culture